Yengejeh (also known as Bengajeh, Yangidzhekh, and Yangijeh) is a village in Sojas Rud Rural District, Sojas Rud District, Khodabandeh County, Zanjan Province, Iran. At the 2006 census, its population was 639, in 166 families.

References 

Populated places in Khodabandeh County